Fernando Tamagnini de Abreu e Silva (13 May 1856 in Tomar, Portugal – 24 November 1924 in Lisbon, Portugal) was a cavalry officer and general of the Portuguese Army.

Biography
He was born on 13 May 1856 in Tomar, Portugal.

As a general, from January 1917 to August 25, 1918, Tamagnini was the commander of the Portuguese Expeditionary Corps (CEP), a 55,000 men army corps that fought with the Allies in the Western Front, during World War I. His successor as commander of the CEP was Tomás António Garcia Rosado.

He died on 24 November 1924 in Lisbon, Portugal.

1856 births
1924 deaths
People from Tomar
Portuguese generals
Portuguese military personnel of World War I
Portuguese people of Italian descent
Recipients of the Order of the Tower and Sword